USS New London County (LST-1066) was an  in the United States Navy. Unlike many of her class, which received only numbers and were disposed of after World War II, she survived long enough to be named. On 1 July 1955, all LSTs still in commission were named for US counties or parishes; LST-1066 was given the name New London County, after the county in Connecticut.

Construction
LST-1066 was laid down on 18 January 1945, at Hingham, Massachusetts, by the Bethlehem-Hingham Shipyard; launched on 21 February 1945; sponsored by Miss Cynthia L. Rowan; and commissioned on 20 March 1945.

Service history

World War II
Following shakedown the newly designated flagship of LST Group 99 departed New York 11 May 1945, in convoy for the Western Pacific. Three months later, having transited the Panama Canal, LST–1066 reached Leyte, Philippines via the Marshall and Caroline Islands. After transferring ammunition to fleet ships, she sailed 18 October, from Lingayen Gulf, Luzon, on the first of two voyages transporting elements of the 6th Army to the Japanese home islands of Honshū and Shikoku for occupation duty.

Post-war 

On 30 November, she joined the procession of ships old and new steaming homeward and arrived San Pedro, California, 13 January 1946. In March 1946, placed out of commission in the reserve, LST–1066 joined the Pacific Reserve Fleet in Puget Sound.

Though given a name, New London County (LST 1066), on 1 July 1955, the ship remained inactive until the aftermath of the Cuban Missile Crisis of 1962. The Navy placed several LSTs in commission in reserve and created ResLSTRon TWO at Little Creek, Virginia. New London County joined this squadron 19 June 1963. Beaching and other training exercises commenced in the fall of 1963, and found real application during the Dominican Republic crisis in the spring of 1965. The escalating war in Vietnam, a country with limited port facilities, caused New London County and her sister ships to be placed in full commission 21 December 1965. After a brief yard period and some intensive refresher training at Pearl Harbor the squadron reached the Western Pacific in April 1966.

Vietnam War 

Home ported at Sasebo, Japan this landing ship spent much of her time unloading supplies, especially cement, along the central coast of South Vietnam. In February 1967, new orders directed the ship to Pusan, South Korea. There she decommissioned on 27 February, and was turned over to the Military Sea Transportation Service (MSTS) in whose service she continued to sail during 1969. On 13 January 1970, while back off the Vietnamese coast, she was damaged by an underwater explosion. She was subsequently towed to Da Nang for repairs.

Awards
Asiatic-Pacific Campaign Medal
World War II Victory Medal
Navy Occupation Medal with "ASIA" clasp
National Defense Service Medal
Vietnam Service Medal with two battle stars

Chilean Navy service 
In August 1973, New London County was sold to Chile where she served as Comandante Hemmerdinger (LST-88), in the Chilean Navy. She was taken out of service on 14 October 1983, and sold for commercial service, 19 January 1984, renamed M/V Maquiserv, Chilean flagged, out of Valparaiso.  Her fate from that point is unknown.

Notes

Citations

Bibliography 

Online resources

External links
 

 

LST-542-class tank landing ships
Ships built in Hingham, Massachusetts
1945 ships
World War II amphibious warfare vessels of the United States
Cold War amphibious warfare vessels of the United States
Vietnam War amphibious warfare vessels of the United States
New London County, Connecticut
LST-542-class tank landing ships of the Chilean Navy